Glaucosciadium is a genus of flowering plants belonging to the family Apiaceae.

Its native range is Southern Turkey, Cyprus, Iran.

Species:

Glaucosciadium cordifolium 
Glaucosciadium insigne

References

Apioideae
Apioideae genera